"The Meaning of Life" is a song released by the American punk rock band The Offspring. It appears as the second track on their fourth studio album, Ixnay on the Hombre (1997), and was released as its third single. The single peaked at #90 on the Australian ARIA singles chart in August 1997.

Track listing

CD single

Promo CD

Music video
A music video was made in support of the single. It was directed by Kevin Kerslake and released in 1997. The video features a high-speed wheel chair race in the desert. The race footage was interspersed with shots of lead singer Dexter Holland hanging upside down in a tree with a capuchin monkey.

DVD appearances
The music video appears on the Complete Music Video Collection DVD, released in 2005.

References in popular culture

"The Meaning of Life" was featured in Tekken: The Motion Picture and Snowriders II, both released in 1997.

Charts

References

External links

1997 singles
The Offspring songs
Songs written by Dexter Holland
1996 songs
Columbia Records singles
Music videos directed by Kevin Kerslake